Andreas Heymann (born 26 December 1966) is a French biathlete. He competed in the men's 20 km individual event at the 1998 Winter Olympics.

References

External links
 

1966 births
Living people
French male biathletes
Olympic biathletes of France
Biathletes at the 1998 Winter Olympics
People from Erzgebirgskreis